Lục Nam is a rural district of Bắc Giang province in the Northeast region of Vietnam. As of 2019 the district had a population of 226,194. The district covers an area of 597 km². The district capital lies at Đồi Ngô. The Mỡ stream can be found here.

Divisions
The district subdivided to 25 commune-level subdivisions, including the township of Đồi Ngô (district capital) and the rural communes of:
Lục Sơn
Bình Sơn
Trường Sơn
Vô Tranh
Trường Giang
Nghĩa Phương
Cương Sơn
Huyền Sơn
Bắc Lũng
Cẩm Lý
Vũ Xá
Đan Hội
Yên Sơn
Lan Mẫu
Phương Sơn
Thanh Lâm
Chu Điện
Bảo Đài
Bảo Sơn
Tam Dị
Đông Phú
Đông Hưng
Tiên Nha
Khám Lạng

References

Districts of Bắc Giang province